Kathryn Fiore (born 1976) is an American actress, voice actress and comedian.

Personal life
She dated fellow voice actor Rino Romano in 1999.

On May 28, 2013, Fiore gave birth to her first child, a girl, named Alice Harper Fiore Tigerman. She suffered complete organ failure after delivering Alice from an emergency cesarean. Fiore is now stabilized after undergoing life-saving procedures, including emergency dialysis.

Filmography

Film

Television

Video games

Other
Various Commercials for ABC Family, FX, and Lifetime Network
The Powerpuff Girls Rule (2008) - Additional voices

Characters
 Katie Williams (Embarrassing Parents)
 Taylor Rosenblatt (Sorority Row: Kappa Kappa Kappa)

Impressions
 Alyssa Milano
 Amber Valletta
 Barbara Pierce Bush
 Barbara Eden (as her character Jeannie from "I Dream of Jeannie")
 Jessica Biel
 Kate Beckinsale
 Lynne Koplitz
 Mandy Moore
 Mary-Kate and Ashley Olsen
 Sarah Michelle Gellar

References

External links
Official Website

Living people
20th-century American actresses
21st-century American actresses
American film actresses
American television actresses
American video game actresses
American voice actresses
1976 births